Percival Robert Brinton (5 February 1873 – 14 May 1958) was an English cricketer, who played one first-class match, for Worcestershire against Oxford University in 1904. He scored only one run in his only innings before being dismissed by Adolph von Ernsthausen.

Brinton was born at Moor Hall, Lower Mitton, Worcestershire, the son of John Brinton Chairman of Brintons carpet manufacturers and MP for Kidderminster. Percival's brother Reginald, also chairman of Brintons, served as Mayor of Kidderminster, and made 13 appearances for Worcestershire.

Brinton died in Oxford at the age of 85.

External links
 

1873 births
1958 deaths
English cricketers
Worcestershire cricketers